Kangan (also Romanized as Kangān; also known as Gangān and Gankān) is a village in Kangan Rural District, in the Central District of Jask County, Hormozgan Province, Iran. At the 2006 census, its population was 213, in 47 families.

References 

Populated places in Jask County